Darryl Jones (born December 11, 1961) is an American bass guitarist.  He has been recording and touring with the Rolling Stones since 1993. He has also played in bands with Miles Davis and Sting, among others.

Career
Darryl Jones was born on December 11 1961 in Chicago, Illinois, on the city's south side. His father was a drummer and his mother frequently listened to soul music on the radio.

When Jones was seven, his father taught him how to play the drums and xylophone. When he was nine, he saw his neighbour Angus Thomas playing bass in a school talent show, which inspired him to switch to bass. He began studying under Thomas, Within a year, he performed with his brother at the next school talent show. His mother would drive him to gigs. After completing the music course at Chicago Vocational High School at 17, Jones started playing on Chicago music scene, playing alongside Vincent Wilburn Jr., Matthew Rose, and Perry Wilson. He attended Southern Illinois University Carbondale.

In 1985, he became a member of Sting's first solo band with Branford Marsalis, Kenny Kirkland, and Omar Hakim. With Sting he recorded the albums Dream of the Blue Turtles and Bring On the Night, and featured in the documentary of the band's formation and touring, also titled Bring On the Night.

In 1993, Jones auditioned to join the Rolling Stones after bassist Bill Wyman retired. He succeeded, touring with them in 1994. Jones has toured and recorded with the band since then.

He is working on a documentary about himself with Eric Hamburg.

Collaborations 
 Decoy – Miles Davis (1984)
 You're Under Arrest – Miles Davis (1985)  
 The Dream of the Blue Turtles – Sting (1985)
 Patti – Patti LaBelle (1985)
 Live in Tokyo – Steps Ahead (1986) with Michael Brecker Mike Mainieri Mike Stern Steve Smith 
 Inside Out – Philip Bailey (1986)
 Journeyman – Eric Clapton (1989)
 Finally Yours – Carmen Bradford (1992)
 What's Inside – Joan Armatrading (1995)
 Organic – Joe Cocker (1996)
 Deuces Wild – B.B. King (1997) alongside The Rolling Stones
 Soulbook – Rod Stewart (2009)
 I Feel Like Playing – Ronnie Wood (2010)
 Wild and Free – Ziggy Marley (2011)
 Storytone – Neil Young (2014)
 Remnants – LeAnn Rimes (2016)

With The Rolling Stones
Voodoo Lounge (1994)
Stripped (1995)
Bridges to Babylon (1997)
No Security (1998)
Live Licks (2004)
A Bigger Bang (2005)
Shine a Light (2008)
Blue & Lonesome (2016)

References

 Wissmann, Chris (1996). "Former SIU Student Playing Bass for Rolling Stones". "Nightlife"

External links

Official Site

1961 births
Living people
African-American guitarists
American rock bass guitarists
American jazz bass guitarists
American male bass guitarists
Southern Illinois University alumni
Miles Davis
American session musicians
The Rolling Stones
The Dead Daisies members
20th-century American bass guitarists
21st-century American bass guitarists
Guitarists from Chicago
American male guitarists
Jazz musicians from Illinois
American male jazz musicians